Stepan Artemovych Pasiuha (11 December 1862 Gregorian date – 1933) was originally from the town of Velyki Pysarivky, Bohodukhiv county, in the Kharkov Governorate of the Russian Empire. He learned to play the bandura from Dmytro Trochenko (Trottchenko). He had seven dumy (sung epic poems) in his repertoire:

1. Marusia Bohuslavka
2. The Widow and her three sons
3. The Sister and Brother
4. Oleksiy Popovych
5. Captives lament
6. Ivan Konovchenko, the Widow's Son
7. The Escape of the Three Brothers from Oziv.

Left and Right - Portraits of S. Pasiuha from 1910 from Slastion's collection of Kobzar portraits.

The first three dumy were recorded on phonograph by Opanas Slastion and sent to Filaret Kolessa in Lviv. Filaret Kolessa wrote that : "In his recitations, sung with a nice baritone, we hear the importance of the recitative above the melody. The singing and playing of Stepan Pasiuha makes a nice artistic impression."

Yehor Movchan was a student of Pasiuha, and highly praised him as a teacher of singing and playing, and also as a kobzar who demonstrated great artism in his performance of dumy. He often spoke: "there probably was never such a kobzar like Pasiuha and in the future there never will be."

In 1910, Opanas Slastion painted two portraits of the kobzar.

In 1915 he was arrested and spent time incarcerated.

Photo: (left) Pasiuha in 1910

Photo: (right) Pasiuha with his student Hryhory Kozhushko in 1913 at the Poltava Artisans exhibition.

From graphic sources his bandura had: 
Portrait 1 - 4 basses and 14 treble strings (16 pegs) 
Portrait 2 - 6 basses and 14 treble strings

Students
Hryhory Kozhushko
Yehor Movchan
Heorhy Tkachenko

Notes

Sources
 Mishalow, V. and M.: Ukrains'ki kobzari-bandurysty, Sydney, Australia, 1986

References

Bandurists
Kobzars
Ukrainian musicians
1933 deaths
1862 births
20th-century Ukrainian musicians